Andergan (also Romanized as Andargān and Āndergān; also known as Andarbān, Anderjāf, Anderyān, Ānderyān, Andīrjān, and Andyrdzhan) is a village in Arzil Rural District of Kharvana District, Varzaqan County, East Azerbaijan province, Iran. At the 2006 National Census, its population was 911 in 228 households. The following census in 2011 counted 1,062 people in 270 households. The latest census in 2016 showed a population of 1,162 people in 321 households; it was the largest village in its rural district.

References 

Varzaqan County

Populated places in East Azerbaijan Province

Populated places in Varzaqan County